Zinc nitrate is an inorganic chemical compound with the formula . This colorless, crystalline salt is highly deliquescent. It is typically encountered as a hexahydrate . It is soluble in both water and alcohol.

Synthesis
Zinc nitrate is usually prepared by dissolving zinc metal, zinc oxide, or related materials in nitric acid:

These reactions are accompanied by the hydration of the zinc nitrate.

The anhydrous salt arises by the reaction of anhydrous zinc chloride with nitrogen dioxide:

Reactions
Treatment of zinc nitrate with acetic anhydride gives zinc acetate. 

On heating, zinc nitrate undergoes thermal decomposition to form zinc oxide, nitrogen dioxide and Oxygen:

Applications
Zinc nitrate has no large scale application but is used on a laboratory scale for the synthesis of coordination polymers. Its controlled decomposition to zinc oxide has also been used for the generation of various ZnO based structures, including nanowires.

It can be used as a mordant in dyeing. An example reaction gives a precipitate of zinc carbonate:

References

zinc
nitrate